Italians in Germany consist of ethnic Italian migrants to Germany and their descendants, both those originating from Italy as well as from among the communities of Italians in Switzerland. Most Italians moved to Germany for reasons of work, others for personal relations, study, or political reasons. Today, Italians in Germany form one of the largest Italian diasporas in the world and account for one of the largest immigrant groups in Germany.

It is not clear how many people in Germany are of Italian descent, since the German government does not collect data on ethnicity. However, based on the German "microcensus," which surveys 1% of the German population annually and includes a question on the nationality of the surveyees' parents, the number is at least 873,000 people. The total number (i.e. including third generation Italian Germans and beyond) is likely considerably higher.

History

Pre-unification (to 1871) 
Large numbers of Italians have resided in Germany since the early Middle Ages, particularly architects, craftsmen and traders. During the late Middle Ages and early modern times many Italians came to Germany for business, and relations between the two countries prospered. The political borders were also somewhat intertwined under the German princes' attempts to extend control over all the Holy Roman Empire, which extended from northern Germany down to Northern Italy. During the Renaissance many Italian bankers, architects and artists moved to Germany and successfully integrated in the German society.

German unification to end of World War II (1871–1945) 
Germany was a comparatively minor destination of Italians during the waves of Italian emigration after Italian unification and the resulting breakdown of the feudal system, with most leaving for the Americas. Between 1876, the year Italy began keeping track of people leaving the country permanently, and 1915, around 1.2 million Italians moved to Germany. For comparison, a total of 14 million Italians emigrated to various parts of the world during this period.

Post-World War II (1945–1990) 

With Germany's post-World War II economic boom (Wirtschaftswunder), the country signed a number of immigration treaties with other mostly European nations starting in 1955 with Italy, which allowed immigrants to move to Germany in large numbers to work and live. The treaty allowed companies experiencing labor shortages to request the transference of Italian workers via the Italian Ministry of Labor. Italy had signed a number of such treaties with other countries in Europe, Oceania and South America in the 1950s to alleviate widespread unemployment. The biggest sectors for which migrants were recruited to Germany were mining, construction and manufacturing. Companies recruiting Italian workers were concentrated primarily in Germany's southeast, especially the industrial states of Baden-Württemberg, North Rhine-Westphalia, Bavaria and Hesse. Today, these regions are home to the country's biggest Italian-German communities.

In 1973, due to that year's oil crisis and a resulting recession, Germany annulled the immigration treaties it had signed. However, by then the European Coal and Steel Community (later the European Economic Community), of which both Italy and Germany were members, had established freedom of movement for workers (beginning in 1968). As a result, Italians continued to be able to move to Germany for work with relative ease. An estimated 2 million Italians moved to Germany between 1956 and 1972 alone, especially from southern and northeastern Italy. The majority of Italians that came with this first wave of immigration were men without families; most intended to return there in the medium term, although a great many ended up settling in Germany permanently. From the early 1970s onward, many of these workers' families joined them. The total number of Italians who moved to Germany between 1955 and 2005 is estimated at 3−4 million.

Initially seen as temporary "guest workers" by both Germany and Italy, almost no effort was made at first to ease the assimilation of immigrants into German society. Adults were not encouraged to learn German and schools were instructed to encourage students' ties to their parents' culture to promote their eventual return. Nonetheless, Italian immigrants gradually began to integrate. While most of the Italians among the 1955–1973 wave of immigrants were employed as laborers in the mining, construction and manufacturing sectors, they began to diversify into more skilled employment, especially in the automotive and electronics industry and mechanical engineering. A growing market for Italian cuisine among the local German population also led many to open restaurants. These trends contributed to the gradual upward mobility of Italian immigrants and their descendants.

After reunification (1990–present) 
Socioeconomic indicators on immigrant groups in Germany are generally hard to come by, since most studies collect data only on the basis of citizenship, which excludes German citizens of Italian descent. However, a study in 2005 showed that Italian-German students remain over-represented in the lower tier of German secondary education (Hauptschulen) and underrepresented in the middle and highest tiers (Realschulen and Gymnasiums). They also remain underrepresented in company leadership positions, the civil service, and white-collar employment. Nevertheless, the gaps are much less extreme than during the era of the biggest waves of arrivals in the mid-20th century, demonstrating the strides the Italian-German community has made since. Although Italians are among the most popular immigrants in Germany, they are often poorly integrated and have little contact with Germans. However, since the reporting of failed integration in the media and measures to promote integration are mostly limited to immigrants from muslim countries, integration problems and disadvantages, especially in terms of education, are increasingly often not clearly perceived among Italian migrants.

This may also be due to the fact that the Italians, like the other southern Europeans, are comparatively well integrated economically and can successfully compensate for their educational deficits in working life. As a result, people with an Italian migration background almost reach the values of the natives in some labor market indicators. Youth unemployment is even lower than that of the autochthonous Germans. The proportion of those dependent on public services also fell from over eleven to under eight percent between the first and second generation.

Among the German cities Wolfsburg and Ludwigshafen had the highest share of Italian migrants in 2011 according to German Census data.

Notable people

See also
Germany–Italy relations

Bibliography
Johannes Augel, Italienische Einwanderung und Wirtschaftstätigkeit in rheinischen Städten des 17. und 18. Jahrhunderts, Bonn, L. Röhrscheid, 1971.
Gustavo Corni, Christof Dipper (eds), Italiani in Germania tra Ottocento e Novecento: spostamenti, rapporti, immagini, influenze, Bologna, Il Mulino, 2006, .
Marco Fincardi, Emigranti a passo romano: operai dell'Alto Veneto e Friuli nella Germania hitleriana, Verona, Cierre, 2002, .
Malte König, Racism within the Axis: Sexual Intercourse and Marriage Plans between Italians and Germans, 1940–3, in: Journal of Contemporary History 54.3, 2019, pp. 508-526.
Brunello Mantelli, Camerati del lavoro. I lavoratori emigrati nel Terzo Reich nel periodo dell'Asse 1938-1943, Scandicci, La Nuova Italia, 1992.
Claudia Martini, Italienische Migranten in Deutschland: transnationale Diskurse, Hamburg, D. Reimer, 2001, .
Edith Pichler, Ethnic economics: the Italian entrepreneurs in Germany, in: Chiapparino, F. (ed.), The Alien Entrepreneur, Milano, 2011, pp. 54-82.
Edith Pichler, 50 anni di immigrazione italiana in Germania: transitori, inclusi/esclusi o cittadini europei?, in: Altreitalie, International journal of studies on Italian migrations in the world, Nr. 33, pp. 6-18. Torino, 2006.
Edith, Pichler, Junge Italiener zwischen Inklusion und Exklusion. Eine Fallstudie. Berlin, 2010.
Edith, Pichler, Dai vecchi pionieri alla nuova mobilità. Italiani a Berlino tra inclusione ed esclusione, in: De Salvo, E./Ugolini, G./Priori, L. (eds), Italo-Berliner. Gli italiani che cambiano la capitale tedesca, Milano-Udine, Mimesis, 2014.

Notes

References

External links
Italian emigration in Germany during the 20th century (in German)

Germany
Germany
 
Ethnic groups in Germany
Germany–Italy relations